Lahman is a surname. Notable people with the surname include:

 Bertha Marion Lahman (1872–1954), American botanist
 Eyal Lahman (born 1965), Israeli football manager
 Sean Lahman (born 1968), American writer and researcher

See also
 Lahmansville, West Virginia, named for the Lahman family who settled in the area prior to West Virginia statehood
Lahmann